The Olympic Kingsway Sports Club, often referenced as Kingsway Olympic, is an Australian football club from Perth, Western Australia. The club was founded in 1953 by Greek immigrants from Macedonia. They moved to their current location at the Kingsway Sporting Complex in Madeley in 1973. They currently have 400 players in teams ranging from Under 6 to under 16, as well as senior Saturday and Sunday Teams. The club currently competes 2023 season in the National Premier Leagues Western Australia.

History

The club was founded in 1953. It was promoted in 1959 to the top division of the State of Western Australia. For the 1978 season, the club was renamed Olympic Kingsway. The club won both the 1978 and 1980 Western Australian State League titles, which qualified them for the 1979 and 1981 NSL Cups. During this period, they also won the Top 4 Cup three times in succession (1978–1980).

They moved back to the Amateur Premier Division for six seasons (2006–2011).

Since the 1990s, Olympic Kingsway has developed many future Australian professional football players, including Nick Ward, Stan Lazaridis, Richard Garcia and Daniel De Silva.

Honours
2020 : State League 1 Champions and Top 4 Cup Winners

2022 : State League 1 Champions (Promoted to the NPLWA Division)

2022 : Masters Over 45's North League 1 Champions (Promoted to the North Premier Division)

External links
 Club Facebook Homepage
 Divisional History (Until 2004)
 Club Directory Information

References

Soccer clubs in Perth, Western Australia